Tiarno di Sopra was a comune (municipality) in Trentino in the Italian region Trentino-Alto Adige/Südtirol. On January 1, 2010, it merged (with Pieve di Ledro, Bezzecca, Concei, Molina di Ledro and Tiarno di Sotto) in the new municipality of Ledro. It is located about 40 km southwest of Trento.

References

External links
 Tiarno di Sopra on Ledro official website

Frazioni of Ledro
Former municipalities of Trentino